Manley may refer to:
 Manley (surname)
 Manley (given name)
 Manley, Cheshire, England, a village and civil parish
 Manley, Devon, a location in England
 Manley, Illinois, United States, an unincorporated community
 Manley, Minnesota, United States, a former community
 Manley, Nebraska, United States, a village
 USS Manley (TB-23), a torpedo boat purchased in 1898
 USS Manley (DD-74), a Caldwell-class destroyer commissioned in 1917
 USS Manley (DD-940), a Forrest Sherman-class destroyer commissioned in 1957
 Manley Career Academy High School, Chicago, Illinois

See also
 Manley Hot Springs, Alaska, USA
 Manley & Associates, a former video game developer
 USS Manley, a list of US Navy ships
 Manly (disambiguation)